Alasdair Bernard Graham  (May 21, 1929 – April 22, 2015) was a Canadian politician, journalist and businessman.

Political career

Graham attempted to win a seat in the House of Commons of Canada in the 1958 election from Nova Scotia, but was defeated in the attempt. On April 27, 1972, he was appointed to the Senate of Canada by Pierre Trudeau. Graham served as president of the Liberal Party of Canada from 1976 until 1980. In 1995, he became deputy government leader in the Senate, and was promoted to Leader of the Government in the Senate in 1997, joining the Cabinet as Nova Scotia's sole representative. The Liberals had lost all of its seats in the province in the 1997 election.  He served in Cabinet until 1999 when Chrétien replaced him with Bernie Boudreau.

Retirement
Graham retired from the Senate in 2004 upon reaching the mandatory retirement age of 75.  His son, Danny Graham, served as leader of the Nova Scotia Liberal Party from 2002 to 2004. Graham died on April 22, 2015.

Archives 
There is a Alasdair B. Graham fonds at Library and Archives Canada.

References

External links 

1929 births
Canadian senators from Nova Scotia
Canadian people of Scottish descent
Candidates in the 1958 Canadian federal election
Liberal Party of Canada senators
Members of the 26th Canadian Ministry
Members of the King's Privy Council for Canada
People from the Cape Breton Regional Municipality
Presidents of the Liberal Party of Canada
2015 deaths
Liberal Party of Canada candidates for the Canadian House of Commons